Hugh Campbell (20 January 1911 — after 1939) was a Scottish professional footballer who played as a winger.

Career
Born in Glasgow, Campbell began his career with Rangers but did not make an appearance for the first team. After a spell with Clapton Orient, he joined Cardiff City where he made one appearance in a 2–1 defeat to Bristol City. He later spent time with Ballymena before finishing his professional career with Halifax Town.

References

1911 births
Date of death missing
Footballers from Glasgow
Scottish footballers
Rangers F.C. players
Leyton Orient F.C. players
Cardiff City F.C. players
Ballymena F.C. players
Halifax Town A.F.C. players
English Football League players
Association football wingers